Crepidium quadrilobum is a species of plant in the family Orchidaceae, endemic to the Philippines.

Description

Taxonomy

Distribution and habitat

Ecology

References

quadrilobum
Orchids of the Philippines